Ahmed Duale Gelle (born 8 July 1949) was the 5th president of Galmudug State of Somalia, in office from 3 May 2017 to 2 February 2020. Before he became Galmudug’s president he was a businessman and former federal parliament member.

Background

Personal life
Gelle was born in 1945 in the city of Galkayo, situated in the Mudug, region of Somalia and hails from the Sacad subclan of Habar Gidir. Gelle stands from the Habar Gidir Hawiye clan

Education
Gelle graduated from Somali National University in Mogadishu, Somalia with Bachelor of Arts in Economics in between 1960-1970.

President of Galmudug

Inauguration
May 29, 2017, Galmudug's president was officially inaugurated into office at a ceremony in the state capital Adado. The event was attended by the president of the Federal Republic of Somalia, Mohamed Abdullahi Mohamed, Jubaland president Ahmed Mohamed Islam (Madobe), Puntland president Abdiweli Mohamed Ali, South West State of Somalia president Sharif Hassan Sheikh Aden, Hirshabelle vice president Cali Cabdulaahi Xuseen (Guudlaawe), governor of Banadir region, UN Special Representative for Somalia Michael Keating, Federal MP's, representatives from Turkey, Djibouti, U.S., EU, AU, Ethiopia and IGAD. It was also attended by Galmudug's public and members of the Somali expatriate community.

Representatives of the international community urged Gelle to hold meetings with Ahlu Sunna Waljama'a (a Galmudug-based paramilitary group consisting of moderate Sufis opposed to Islamist groups such as Al-Shabaab) although reconciliation meetings were held before Galmudug's election and despite the first round of talks being successful, it was curtailed by the presidential campaign of Galmudug State.
Gelle promised to find solutions and hold meetings with Ahlu Sunna Waljama'a And he also promised to find solutions for Galkayo conflicts between Puntland and Galmudug before he selects his cabinet.

See also

 Politics of Somalia
 Lists of office-holders

References

Former MP elected as Galmudug President
allafrica.com

External link

Presidents of Galmudug
Somalian economists
Somalian businesspeople
Somali National University alumni
Living people
1949 births